Roberto Cenni (born 14 September 1972 in Prato) is an Italian politician.

He is a member of the centre-right party Forza Italia and served as Mayor of Prato from June 2009 to May 2014.

See also
2009 Italian local elections
List of mayors of Prato

References

External links
 

Living people
1972 births
Forza Italia (2013) politicians
The People of Freedom politicians
21st-century Italian politicians
Mayors of Prato